The Berlin International Literature Festival or ilb is an annual event based in Berlin. Every September, the festival presents contemporary poetry, prose, nonfiction, graphic novels and international children's and young adult literature. Renowned authors present themselves next to new talents within the wide-ranging and political programme. The festival is an event of the "Internationale Peter-Weiss-Stiftung". The founder and festival director is Ulrich Schreiber.
The 20th ilb was set to take place September 9 through 19, 2020.

Programme 

The festival's programme is divided into subsections: Literatures of the World, Reflections, Specials, International Children’s and Young Adult Literature and Speak, Memory. The Specials section is subdivided into New German Voices, Slam Revue,  and Scritture Giovani, an international competition for young authors.

Every year, a Graphic Novel Day is featured during the festival. Since 2002, internationally-renowned guest authors of the ilb have voluntarily visited Berlin prisons during the festival to read from their books and discuss them with inmates. Since 2005, there have been annual collaborations with Science Year, an initiative by the Federal Ministry of Education and Research. Since 2019, the ilb has cooperated with the Cluster of Excellence "Temporal Communities: Doing Literature in a Global Perspective" at FU Berlin. 

At all events of the ilb texts are presented by the authors in their mother tongue, followed by a German translation of the readings, which are performed by actors. A discussion between the presenter, author and  audience follows each reading.

Every year, the ilb opens with a celebratory opening event. Opening speakers have included Petina Gappah (2019), Eva Menasse (2018), Elif Shafak (2017), César Aira (2016), Javier Marías (2015), Pankaj Mishra (2014), Taiye Selasi (2013), Liao Yiwu (2012), Tahar Ben Jelloun (2011), Juan Goytisolo (2010), Arundhati Roy (2009), Nancy Huston (2008), David Grossman (2007), Édouard Glissant (2006), Carlos Fuentes (2005), Antjie Krog (2004), Shashi Tharoor (2003), Dževad Karahasan (2002), and Charles Simic (2001).

(translation: The Extraordinary Book) is an international children's and youth literature prize. Since 2012, it has been awarded every year in September by the Children's and Youth Literature section of the festival. The award honors remarkable books for children, teenagers and young adults.

The books are selected by a group of voting members that changes annually.  The voting group consists mainly of international adult writers and illustrators, and has also included scientists, politicians and young writers. Each member selects one book to be awarded. Members in previous years have included Azouz Begag, John Boyne, Jennifer Clement, Roddy Doyle, Jón Gnarr, David Graeber, Robert Habeck, Navid Kermani, Geert Mak, Scott McCloud, David Van Reybrouck, Boualem Sansal, Riad Sattouf, Raoul Schrott, and Meg Wolitzer. 

From 2012 to 2020, 240 books have been awarded, including The Invisible Cities, The Adventures of Pinocchio, 'The Diary of a Young Girl, the Struwwelpeter, Odyssey, The Little Prince, The Treasure Island,  and Around the World in Eighty Days.

 Multiple award-winning books 

 Momo by Michael Ende (2012, 2013, twice in 2019)
 The Arrival by Shaun Tan (2013, 2015, 2016, 2019)
 Ronia, the Robber's Daughter by Astrid Lindgren (2012, 2018, 2019)
 Watership Down by Richard Adams (2018, 2020)
 Skellig by David Almond (2016, 2020)
 Don Quixote by Miguel de Cervantes (2016, 2020)
 The Alchemist by Paulo Coelho (2012, 2019)
 Danny Champion of the World by Roald Dahl (2015, 2016)
 Emil and the Detectives by Erich Kästner (2015, 2017)
 The golden compass by Philip Pullman (2012, 2014)
 History of Western Philosophy by Bertrand Russell (2012, 2013)
 Holes by Louis Sachar (2013, 2014)
 The River by Alessandro Sanna (2016, 2018)
 Where the Sidewalk Ends by Shel Silverstein (2014, 2016)
 The Treasure Island by Robert Louis Stevenson (2012, 2014)
 Brown Girl Dreaming by Jacqueline Woodson (2016, 2018)

 Multiple award-winning writers 

 Michael Ende, six-time winner for The Night of Wishes, The Neverending Story and Momo Roald Dahl, five-time winner for Charlie and the Chocolate Factory, Danny Champion of the World, The Wonderful Story of Henry Sugar and Six More and The BFG Shaun Tan, five-time winner for The Lost Thing and The Arrival Astrid Lindgren, four-time winner for Mio, My Son and Ronia, the Robber's Daughter Tonke Dragt, three-time winner for Letter to the King, Aan de andere kant van de deur and Torenhoog en mijlenbreed Erich Kästner, three-time winner for The 35th of May, or Conrad's Ride to the South Seas and Emil and the Detectives Mark Twain, three-time winner for The Adventures of Huckleberry Finn, The Adventures of Tom Sawyer and Roughing It Guests 

Since 2001, more than 2,500 authors from more than 120 countries have presented their work at the festival, among them Nobel Prize Winners Svetlana Alexievich, J. M. Coetzee, Nadine Gordimer, Günter Grass, Doris Lessing, Herta Müller, Orhan Pamuk, Wole Soyinka, Mario Vargas Llosa, Gao Xingjian as well as Charles Simic, Han Kang, Juli Zeh, Rebecca Solnit, Monica Ali, Samantha Schweblin, Carla Guelfenbein, Yasmina Reza, Mona Eltahawy, Hanan al-Shaykh, Marie NDiaye, Ozge Samanci, Dacia Maraini, Ljudmila Ulitzkaya, Bernice Chauly, Laksmi Pamuntiak, and Antonio Tabucchi.  

 Sponsorship and Partners 
The festival's main sponsor is Hauptstadtkulturfonds Berlin. Additional sponsors are the Federal Foreign Office, the Heinrich Böll Foundation, the Foundation Jan Michalski and embassies, cultural institutes and publishing houses.

 Annual publications 

 Catalogue: The annually-published festival catalogue contains photos, biographies and selected bibliographies of all participating writers.
 The Berlin Anthology: All authors who participated in the program section 'Literatures of the World' come together and select 99 poems, that will be published in their original language and a German translation.
 Scritture Giovani: Each year, the ilb'' publishes five short stories which have been exclusively written for the ilb Scritture Giovani contest according to a specific theme in the languages of the five participating countries (UK, Italy, Norway, Germany and a guest country).

References

External links 
 Official festival website
 Programme booklets 
 Opening speeches
 Official website of the Worldwide Readings
 Word Alliance
 Das außergewöhnliche Buch website (in German)
 Das außergewöhnliche Buch website (in English)
 Children´s and Youth Program of the International Literature Festival Berlin (English key facts)

Literary festivals in Germany
Festivals in Berlin
Children's literary awards
German literary awards
Awards established in 2012